Scerni is a town of 3,645 inhabitants of the province of Chieti is part of the Middle Vastese. The county has borders with Atessa, Gissi, Monteodorisio and Pollutri.

Scerni was once part of the Kingdom of Two Sicilies.

Climate 

Description 
The town is attractive, amid gentle hills and with a mild climate.
It is distinguished by the production of olive oil, wine and sausages (the speciality is the Ventricina variety).

History 
The origins of Scerni are lost in the mists of time. The only certainty is that the site where the village stands now was inhabited in prehistoric and ancient Roman times. In the medieval ages, several castles and fortifications were built in and around the city.

At the time of the French Revolution, the Baron De Riseis sided with the people of the country with Giuseppe Proni from Introdacqua, former cleric of the Marquis of Vasto, against the invasion of the Jacobins

On 25, 26 and 27 February 1860 more than a thousand peasants armed with clubs and halberds invaded the estate of the Marquis D'Avalos, destroying a rural house, stealing firewood and beating up the forest guards. The peasant fury and its numerical superiority defeated the police and the urban guards of Pollutri and Monteodorisio. It was a real uproar led with firearms in hand, led by Michelangelo Tarquinio, Giuseppe "Passaguai" Menna and Luigi Berarducci.

Places
The patron saint of Scerni is San Panfilo (Saint Pamphilus of Sulmona). There is a church consecrated to him. Other attractions are the Palazzo De Riseis.

Distinguished citizens 
 Giuseppe De Riseis, (Scerni, Chieti, 1833 - Rome, 1924), politician.
 Leonardo Umile (Scerni, 1919 - to Bastia Nardi Licciana, 1944) partisan.

See also
Abruzzo (wine)
Chieti (province)
Ventricina (food)

Notes

External links 
 Official website of the municipality (in Italian)
 webcam on Scerni (in Italian)
 Pro Loco Scerni on Facebook (in Italian)
 Comune di Scerni on Facebook (in Italian)

Cities and towns in Abruzzo